Bill Nestell (March 3, 1893 – October 18, 1966) was an American film actor and stuntman. He appeared in more than 100 films between 1926 and 1950. He was born in California, and died in Bishop, California from a heart attack.

Selected filmography
 Sir Lumberjack (1926)
 When the Law Rides (1928)
 Cheyenne Trails (1928)
 The Fighting Legion (1930)
 Desert Vengeance (1931)
 The Night Riders (1939)
 New Frontier (1939)
 Three Faces West (1940)

References

External links

1893 births
1966 deaths
American male film actors
20th-century American male actors
Male Western (genre) film actors